Norman... Is That You? is a 1976 American comedy film directed by George Schlatter and starring Redd Foxx and Pearl Bailey. It is based on the play Norman, Is That You? The film version changes the locale from New York City to Los Angeles and substitutes an African American family for a Jewish family in the original play.

Overview
Ben Chambers arrives in Los Angeles to seek consolation from his son, Norman. Ben is upset and confused  after his wife abandons the family dry-cleaning business in Tucson and runs away to Mexico with her brother-in-law.   Ben Chambers discovers his son is gay after he finds Norman's lover, Garson, in the bedroom.  While dealing with the abandonment of his wife, Ben tries to understand his son's orientation.  After an altercation with Norman, due to Ben hiring a prostitute for Norman,  Ben forms a bond with Garson.

Cast
 Redd Foxx as Ben Chambers
 Pearl Bailey as Beatrice Chambers
 Dennis Dugan as Garson Hobart
 Michael Warren as Norman Chambers
 Tamara Dobson as Audrey
 Vernee Watson-Johnson	as Melody (as Vernée Watson)
 Jayne Meadows as Adele Hobart
 George Furth as Mr. Sukara, Bookstore Clerk
 Barbara Sharma as Lady Bookstore Clerk
 Sergio Aragonés as Desk Clerk
 Sosimo Hernandez as Desk Clerk
 Wayland Flowers as Larry Davenport
 Allan Drake as Cab Driver

Reception
Roger Ebert of the Chicago Sun-Times gave the film 2 stars out of 4 and wrote "The movie isn't much (and it's based on a Broadway play that was even less), but while Foxx is onscreen we're willing to forgive it a lot. He stands there in a clutter of cliches, bad jokes and totally baffling character motivation, and he makes us laugh." Richard Eder of The New York Times stated "It is a series of bad jokes about homosexuality, strung upon trite situation comedy and collapsing into what is meant to be an uplifting message about people being allowed to do their own thing." Gene Siskel of the Chicago Tribune gave the film 1.5 stars out of 4 and called it "a hopelessly dated comedy" with "predictable" jokes and a "dreadfully slow pace." Arthur D. Murphy of Variety called it "an uneven, sporadically amusing forced comedy effort." Charles Champlin of the Los Angeles Times wrote that the film "began life as a play, but it now looks like television, feels like television, was cast from television (Redd Foxx), lit and shot like television (on tape, mostly, rather than film) and needs only a laugh track to come off like a slightly gamier television sitcom." Gary Arnold of The Washington Post panned it as "a feeble attempt at bedroom farce."

References

External links

1976 films
1970s sex comedy films
African-American LGBT-related films
African-American comedy films
American sex comedy films
1970s English-language films
1976 LGBT-related films
American films based on plays
Films set in Los Angeles
Gay-related films
LGBT-related comedy films
American LGBT-related films
Metro-Goldwyn-Mayer films
United Artists films
1976 directorial debut films
1976 comedy films
Homophobia in fiction
Films about anti-LGBT sentiment
1970s American films